General (Honorary) Ira Clarence Eaker (April 13, 1896 – August 6, 1987) was a general of the United States Army Air Forces during World War II. Eaker, as second-in-command of the prospective Eighth Air Force, was sent to England to form and organize its bomber command. While he struggled to build up airpower in England, the organization of the Army Air Forces evolved and he was named commander of the Eighth Air Force on December 1, 1942.

Although his background was in single-engine fighter aircraft, Eaker became the architect of a strategic bombing force that ultimately numbered forty groups of 60 heavy bombers each, supported by a subordinate fighter command of 1,500 aircraft, most of which was in place by the time he relinquished command at the start of 1944. Eaker then took overall command of four Allied air forces based in the Mediterranean Theater of Operations, and by the end of World War II had been named Deputy Commander of the U.S. Army Air Forces. He worked in the aerospace industry following his retirement from the military, then became a newspaper columnist.

Childhood and education
Eaker was born in Field Creek, Texas, in 1896, the son of a Dutch tenant farmer. He attended Southeastern State Teachers College in Durant, Oklahoma, and then joined the United States Army in 1917. He was appointed a second lieutenant of Infantry, Officer's Reserve Corps, and assigned to active duty with the 64th Infantry Regiment at Camp Bliss, El Paso, Texas. The 64th Infantry was assigned to the 14th Infantry Brigade on December 20, 1917, to be part of the 7th Infantry Division when it deployed to France. On November 15, 1917, Eaker received a commission in the Regular Army. He later received a Bachelor of Arts degree in journalism from the University of Southern California in 1934.

Air Service and Air Corps career
Eaker remained with the 64th Infantry until March 1918, when he was placed on detached service to receive flying instruction at Austin and Kelly Fields in Texas. Upon graduation the following October, he was rated a pilot and assigned to Rockwell Field, California.

In July 1919, he transferred to the Philippine Islands, where he served with the 2d Aero Squadron at Fort Mills until September 1919; with the 3d Aero Squadron at Camp Stotsenburg until September 1920, and as executive officer of the Department Air Office, Department and Assistant Department Air Officer, Philippine Department, and in command of the Philippine Air Depot at Manila until September 1921.

Meanwhile, on July 1, 1920, he was commissioned into the Regular Army as a captain in the Air Service and returned to the United States in January 1922, for duty at Mitchel Field, New York, where he commanded the 5th Aero Squadron and later was post adjutant.

In June 1924, Eaker was named executive assistant in the Office of Air Service at Washington, D.C., and from December 21, 1926, to May 2, 1927, he served as a pilot of one of the Loening OA-1 float planes of the Pan American Goodwill Flight that made a 22,000 mile (35,200 km) trip around South America and, with the others, was awarded the Mackay Trophy. He then became executive officer in the Office of the Assistant Secretary of War at Washington, D.C.

In September 1926, he was named operations and line maintenance officer at Bolling Field, Washington, D.C. While on that duty, he participated as chief pilot on the endurance flight of the Army plane, Question Mark, from 1 to January 7, 1929, establishing a new world flight endurance record.  For this achievement the entire crew of five, including Eaker and mission commander Major Carl Spaatz, were awarded the DFC. In 1930, he made the first transcontinental flight entirely with instruments.

In October 1934, Eaker was ordered to duty at March Field, Calif., where he commanded the 34th Pursuit Squadron and later the 17th Pursuit Squadron. In the summer of 1935, he was detached for duty with the Navy and participated aboard the aircraft carrier USS Lexington, on maneuvers in Hawaii and Guam.

Eaker entered the Air Corps Tactical School at Maxwell Field, Alabama, in August 1935, and upon graduation the following June entered the Command and General Staff School at Fort Leavenworth, Kansas, from which he graduated in June 1937. During his time at Ft Leavenworth from June 3–7, 1936, Eaker made the first blind (instruments only) transcontinental flight from New York to Los Angeles. He then became assistant chief of the Information Division in the Office of the Chief of Air Corps (OCAC) at Washington, D.C., during which he helped plan and publicize the interception of the Italian liner Rex at sea. In November 1940, Eaker was given command of the 20th Pursuit Group at Hamilton Field, California. He was promoted in 1941 to colonel while at Hamilton Field.

World War II

Promoted to brigadier general in January 1942, he was assigned to organize the VIII Bomber Command (which became the Eighth Air Force) in England and to understudy the British system of bomber operations. Then, in December 1942, he assumed command of the Eighth Air Force. In a speech he gave to the British that won him favorable publicity, he said, "We won't do much talking until we've done more fighting. After we've gone, we hope you'll be glad we came."

Much of Eaker's initial staff, including Captain Frederick W. Castle, Captain Beirne Lay, Jr., and Lieutenant Harris Hull, was composed of reserve rather than career military officers, and the group became known as "Eaker's Amateurs". Eaker's position as commander of the Eighth Air Force led to his becoming the model for the fictional Major General Pat Pritchard in the 1949 movie Twelve O'Clock High.

Throughout the war, Eaker was an advocate for daylight "precision" bombing of military and industrial targets in German-occupied territory and ultimately Germany—of striking at the enemy's ability to wage war while minimizing civilian casualties. The British considered daylight bombing too risky and wanted the Americans to join them in night raids that would target wider areas, but Eaker persuaded a skeptical Winston Churchill that the American and British approaches complemented each other in a one-page memo that concluded, "If the RAF continues night bombing and we bomb by day, we shall bomb them round the clock and the devil shall get no rest." He personally participated in the first US B-17 Flying Fortress bomber strike against German occupation forces in France, bombing Rouen on August 17, 1942.
Eaker was promoted to major general in September 1943. However, as American bomber losses mounted from German defensive fighter aircraft attacks on deep penetration missions beyond the range of available fighter cover, Eaker may have lost some of the confidence of USAAF Commanding General Henry Arnold. To reduce losses to fighters, Eaker was a strong advocate of the Boeing YB-40 Flying Fortress, a B-17 Flying Fortress which carried additional gun turrets and gunners instead of a bomb load and was intended to act as a long-range, "gunship" escort for conventional bombers. However the YB-40 was not a success in combat. Eaker also strongly advocated work on improving the range of conventional fighters using drop tanks.

When General Dwight D. Eisenhower was named Supreme Allied Commander in December 1943, he proposed to use his existing team of subordinate commanders, including Lieutenant General Jimmy Doolittle, in key positions. Doolittle was named Eighth Air Force Commander, and Arnold concurred with the change.

Eaker was reassigned as Commander-in-Chief of the Mediterranean Allied Air Forces, previous commander Tedder having been selected by Eisenhower to plan the air operations for the Normandy invasion. Eaker had under his command the Twelfth and Fifteenth Air Forces and the British Desert and Balkan Air Forces. He did not approve of the plan to bomb Monte Cassino in February 1944, considering it a dubious military target, but ultimately signed off the mission and gave in to pressure from ground commanders. Historians of the era now generally believe Eaker's skepticism was correct and that the ancient abbey at Monte Cassino could have been preserved without jeopardizing the allied advance through Italy. He personally led the first raid of Operation Frantic on 2 July 1944, flying in a B-17 called Yankee Doodle II and landing at a Soviet base at Polotava in the Ukraine.

On April 30, 1945, General Eaker was named deputy commander of the Army Air Forces and Chief of the Air Staff. He retired on August 31, 1947, and was promoted to lieutenant general in the newly established United States Air Force on the retired list June 29, 1948.

Almost 40 years after his retirement, Congress attempted to pass special legislation awarding four-star status in the U.S. Air Force to General Eaker, prompted by retired Air Force Reserve major general and Senator Barry Goldwater (R-AZ). The legislation stalled in the House, which prompted Goldwater to only seek confirmation via the Senate, which was arguably unlawful because of statutory restrictions on general officers that required them to be in active service. On April 26, 1985, Chief of Staff General Charles A. Gabriel and Ruth Eaker, the general's wife, pinned on his fourth star. Later, in 1986, the Comptroller General ruled that the promotion was unlawful for pay or benefit purposes due to the lack of implementing legislation.

Civilian career

Ten days before the Democratic Party primary runoff election of the 1948 United States Senate election in Texas on Saturday, August 28, 1948, Eaker spoke in support of candidate Lyndon B. Johnson. Coke R. Stevenson's campaign attacked Eaker, and Eaker was defended by other prominent military officers and Johnson. Criticizing a prominent military leader so soon after World War II likely had a negative effect on Stevenson's turnout in the election, and in Howard County in particular (which had quartered an Army Air Force Bombardier School during World War II) returned an abnormally high net gain for Johnson as compared to his gains in other areas. Johnson would go on to be declared the winner of the election by a small margin.

Eaker was a vice president of Hughes Tool Company and Hughes Aircraft (1947–57) and of Douglas Aircraft (1957–61).

While stationed in New York in the early 1920s, Eaker studied law at Columbia University. Eaker went back to school in the early 1930s at the University of Southern California and received a degree in journalism.
With Henry Arnold, Eaker co-authored This Flying Game (1936),
Winged Warfare (1937),

and Army Flyer (1942). Starting in 1962, he wrote a weekly column, carried by many newspapers, on military affairs.

Eaker was inducted into the National Aviation Hall of Fame, in Dayton, Ohio, in 1970. Over his 30 years of flying, General Eaker accumulated 12,000 flying hours as pilot.

On September 26, 1978, the U.S. Congress passed, and on October 10, 1978, President Jimmy Carter signed, Public Law 95-438, which awarded the Congressional Gold Medal to General Eaker, "in recognition of his distinguished career as an aviation pioneer and Air Force leader".

Eaker died August 6, 1987, at Malcolm Grow Medical Center, Andrews Air Force Base, Maryland, and is buried in Arlington National Cemetery.

Blytheville Air Force Base, Strategic Air Command (SAC) installation, was renamed Eaker Air Force Base on May 26, 1988.  Eaker AFB was closed on March 6, 1992, due to Base Realignment and Closure (BRAC) action.  Military to civilian conversion began, and public aircraft began using the decommissioned base. The military still uses the renamed Arkansas International Airport.

The airport in Durant, Oklahoma was renamed Eaker Field to honor Eaker, a graduate of Southeastern State College in Durant. Now known as Southeastern Oklahoma State University, the student aviation majors use the airport as the home of the flight school.

Dates of rank

Source:

Awards and decorations
  Command pilot
   Air Force Distinguished Service Medal
   Army Distinguished Service Medal with two oak leaf clusters
   Navy Distinguished Service Medal
   Silver Star
   Legion of Merit
   Distinguished Flying Cross with oak leaf cluster
   Air Medal
   World War I Victory Medal
   American Defense Service Medal
   American Campaign Medal
   European-African-Middle East Campaign Medal with bronze service stars
   World War II Victory Medal
   Knight Commander of the Order of the British Empire
   Knight Commander of the Bath
   Legion of Honor, Grand Officer (France)
   Croix de Guerre with Palm (France)
   Silver Cross of Merit with Swords (Krzyż Zasługi z Mieczami) (Poland)
   Order of Kutuzov, Second Degree (USSR)
   Grand Master of the Order of Saints Maurice and Lazarus (Italy)
   Order of the Liberator General San Martin, Commander (Spanish: Comendador) (Argentina)
   Order of the Southern Cross, Grand Officer (Brazil)
   Officer, Order of the Sun (Peru)
   Order of Aeronautical Merit (Brazil)
   Order of the Condor of the Andes (Bolivia)
   Order of Merit, Officer (Chile)
   Order of the Liberator, Officer (Venezuela)
   Order of the Partisan Star, First Class (Yugoslavia)
 Congressional Gold Medal

General Ira C. Eaker Award

The General Ira C. Eaker Award is given by the Civil Air Patrol in honor of the former Deputy Commander U.S. Army Air Forces and aviation pioneer. It is presented to cadets who have completed the requirements of the final phase of the cadet program. The award is accompanied by promotion to the grade of Cadet Lieutenant Colonel, the second highest grade in the program.

In 1970, Eaker was inducted into the National Aviation Hall of Fame in Dayton, Ohio. 

In 1993 he was inducted into the Airlift/Tanker Association Hall of Fame.

In 1981, Eaker was inducted into the International Air & Space Hall of Fame at the San Diego Air & Space Museum.

Influence on literature
Kurt Vonnegut quotes his foreword to David Irving's The Destruction of Dresden in his novel Slaughterhouse-Five.

See also

References

External links

Ira C. Eaker at ArlingtonCemetery.net, an unofficial website
Encyclopedia of Oklahoma History and Culture – Eaker, Ira
Generals of World War II

1896 births
1987 deaths
Air Corps Tactical School alumni
American aviation record holders
Burials at Arlington National Cemetery
Columbia Law School alumni
Commanders of the Order of the Liberator General San Martin
Congressional Gold Medal recipients
Flight endurance record holders
Grand Officiers of the Légion d'honneur
Honorary Knights Commander of the Order of the Bath
Honorary Knights Commander of the Order of the British Empire
Knights of the Order of Saints Maurice and Lazarus
Mackay Trophy winners
Military personnel from Texas
National Aviation Hall of Fame inductees
People from Mason County, Texas
Recipients of the Air Force Distinguished Service Medal
Recipients of the Air Medal
Recipients of the Croix de Guerre 1939–1945 (France)
Recipients of the Cross of Merit with Swords (Poland)
Recipients of the Distinguished Flying Cross (United States)
Recipients of the Distinguished Service Medal (US Army)
Recipients of the Legion of Merit
Recipients of the Navy Distinguished Service Medal
Recipients of the Order of Kutuzov, 2nd class
4 Eaker, Ira C.
Recipients of the Silver Star
Southeastern Oklahoma State University alumni
United States Air Force generals
United States Army Air Forces bomber pilots of World War II
United States Army Air Forces generals of World War II
United States Army Air Forces generals
United States Army Command and General Staff College alumni
United States Army personnel of World War I
USC Annenberg School for Communication and Journalism alumni